Hanover is a town located along the Connecticut River in Grafton County, New Hampshire, United States. As of the 2020 census, its population was 11,870. The town is home to the Ivy League university  Dartmouth College, the U.S. Army Corps of Engineers Cold Regions Research and Engineering Laboratory, and Hanover High School. The Appalachian Trail crosses the town, connecting with a number of trails and nature preserves.

Most of the population resides in the Hanover census-designated place (CDP)—the main village of the town. Located at the junctions of New Hampshire routes 10, 10A, and 120, the Hanover CDP recorded a population of 9,078 people at the 2020 census. The town also contains the smaller villages of Etna and Hanover Center.

History

Hanover was chartered by Governor Benning Wentworth on July 4, 1761, and in 1765–1766 its first European inhabitants arrived, the majority from Connecticut. Although the surface is uneven, the town developed into an agricultural community.

At one point in its history, the southwest corner of Hanover, site of "The Plain", was known as "Dresden", which in the 1780s joined other disgruntled New Hampshire towns along the Connecticut River that briefly defected to what was then the independent Vermont Republic. After various political posturings, however, the towns returned to New Hampshire at the heated insistence of George Washington. One remnant of this era is that the name "Dresden" is still used in the Dresden School District, an interstate school district serving both Hanover and Norwich, Vermont—the first and one of the few interstate school districts in the nation.

The film Winter Carnival (1939) was shot in Hanover.

Etymology 

"Hannover" (as it was spelled in the 1761 charter and in its German original form as well) was named either after a local parish in Sprague, Connecticut, or after the German House of Hanover in honor of the reigning British-Hanoverian king, George III.  The original Han(n)over is a city (capital) in Lower Saxony, North Germany. The name of the German city derives from the Low German form of what is "hohes Ufer" in German, which translates into "high shore" in English, and describes the high shore of the Leine river (see :de:Am Hohen Ufer, in German).

While it is likely that the name "Dresden" derived from Dresden in Germany, it has also been suggested that it could derive directly from the old Sorbian word drezg ("forest") or Drezd'ane, for an inhabitant of a forest.

Geography

The primary settlement in Hanover, where over 75% of the town's population resides, is in the southwest corner of the town and is defined as the Hanover census-designated place (CDP). It contains the areas around Dartmouth College and the intersections of New Hampshire Routes 10, 10A, and 120.

Hanover borders the towns of Lyme, Canaan, and Enfield, New Hampshire; Norwich, Vermont; and the city of Lebanon, New Hampshire. Inside the limits of Hanover are the small rural villages of Etna and Hanover Center.

Hanover lies fully within the Connecticut River watershed.

There are a number of trails and nature preserves in Hanover, and the majority of these trails are suitable for snowshoes and cross-country skis. The Velvet Rocks Trail, located on the Appalachian Trail, has a number of rock climbing and bouldering spots.

Climate

According to the Köppen Climate Classification system, Hanover has a warm-summer humid continental climate, abbreviated "Dfb" on climate maps.

Demographics

As of the census of 2010, there were 11,260 people, 3,119 households, and 1,797 families residing in the town. The racial makeup of the town was 81.0% White, 3.4% Black, 0.8% Native American, 10.8% Asian, 0.03% Pacific Islander, 0.7% from other races, and 3.2% from two or more races. Hispanic or Latino of any race were 3.9% of the population.

There were 3,119 households, out of which 27.4% had children under the age of 18 living with them, 51.5% were married couples living together, 4.7% had a female householder with no husband present, and 42.4% were non-families. 31.0% of all households were made up of individuals, and 16.1% had someone living alone who was 65 years of age or older. The average household size was 2.37 and the average family size was 2.95.

In the town, the population was spread out, with 27.8% at or under the age of 19, 25.5% from 20 to 24, 14.4% from 25 to 44, 18.6% from 45 to 64, and 13.7% who were 65 years of age or older. The median age was 23 years.

For the period 2010–2014, the estimated median income for a household in the town was $94,063, and the median income for a family was $129,000. Male full-time workers had a median income of $87,550 versus $53,141 for females. The per capita income for the town was $34,140. About 2.0% of families and 12.0% of the population were below the poverty line, including 3.4% of those under age 18 and 4.8% of those age 65 or over.

Government

In the New Hampshire Senate, Hanover is included in the 5th District and is represented by Democrat Suzanne Prentiss. On the New Hampshire Executive Council, Hanover is in the 1st District and is represented by Republican Joseph Kenney. In the United States House of Representatives, Hanover is a part of New Hampshire's 2nd congressional district and is currently represented by Democrat Ann McLane Kuster.

Like most other college towns, Hanover is a liberal bastion and a Democratic stronghold in presidential elections. No Republican presidential nominee has managed to receive over 32 percent of the vote in the town in the past two decades. Hanover backed Hillary Rodham Clinton with 85 percent of the vote in 2016, providing the former Secretary of State and U.S. Senator from New York with her largest margin of victory in the state of New Hampshire, which she narrowly won by 2,736 votes statewide. Her margin of victory in Hanover was by over twice that amount, allowing attribution that her margin in Hanover was what ultimately allowed her to carry the Granite State. However, Hanover did not back Clinton in the 2008 Democratic primary (supporting Barack Obama with 58.15 percent of the vote to Clinton's 26.11 percent) nor did it support her in the 2016 Democratic primary when voters opted for U.S. Senator Bernie Sanders from neighboring Vermont with 53.04 percent of the vote.

Education

Public schools
 Hanover High School
 Frances C. Richmond Middle School
 Bernice A. Ray Elementary School

Universities
Dartmouth College

Private schools
The Clark School was at one time located in Hanover but merged with Cardigan Mountain School in the nearby town of Canaan in 1953.

Economy

Hypertherm, White Mountains Insurance Group, and Daat Research Corp. are based in Hanover.

Infrastructure

Water
The Hanover Water Company supplies water for downtown Hanover from several local reservoirs. The company is owned by Dartmouth College (52.8%) and the Town of Hanover (47.2%), with management by the Town of Hanover under a contract. In 2000, all full-time company employees became town employees. In recent years, the town has spent over $20 million to upgrade main water lines, and will undergo another $6 million project to build a new water treatment plant. Outside the downtown area, residents rely on private wells that are not maintained by the town.

Other utilities
FairPoint Communications furnishes telephone communication. The municipality provides sewage treatment.

Plaudits

CNN and Money magazine rated Hanover the sixth best place to live in America in 2011, and the second best in 2007. "This just might be the best college town," read the headline of a story in the January–February 2017 issue of Yankee.

Notable people

References

External links

 
 Upper Valley Business Alliance
 Howe Library
 New Hampshire Economic and Labor Market Information Bureau Profile

 
Populated places established in 1761
New Hampshire populated places on the Connecticut River
Towns in Grafton County, New Hampshire
Towns in New Hampshire